Go East Anglia is a bus operator in Essex, Suffolk and Norfolk, owned by the Go-Ahead Group. The group consists of Konectbus and Hedingham & Chambers.

History
Go East Anglia was initially formed in 2010, when the Go-Ahead Group purchased Konectbus.

In 2012, Go-Ahead also purchased Anglian Bus, Hedingham and Chambers. Anglian Bus was quickly merged into the Konectbus brand, rendering the name obsolete quickly.

Subsidiaries 
Go East Anglia originally did not operate any buses in its own right, with all being legally operated by Konectbus Limited, H.C.Chambers & Son Limited or Hedingham & District Omnibuses Limited. However, the different companies remain distinct brands. In 2018, all the companies' vehicles were brought together under the Konectbus licence.

 Konectbus – Norfolk
 Park and Ride Norwich – A Konectbus brand operating the Park and Ride contract in Norwich.
 Hedingham & Chambers – Essex & Suffolk
 Hedingham – Essex 
 Chambers – Suffolk

Fleet
As at November 2019, Go East Anglia operated 190 buses and coaches from nine depots.

References

Bus operators in Essex
Bus operators in Suffolk
Bus operators in Norfolk
Go-Ahead Group companies